Bavayia cocoensis is a species of geckos endemic to New Caledonia.

At the time of its description in 2022 this species was only known from one area of the Koniambo Massif with an area of 2 sq km, and was considered to meet the IUCN Red List criteria for being Critically Endangered.

References

Bavayia
Reptiles described in 2022
Taxa named by Aaron M. Bauer
Taxa named by Ross Allen Sadlier
Taxa named by Todd R. Jackman
Geckos of New Caledonia